Henry William "Robbie" "Captain" Robinson (October 26, 1893 – ?) was a college football player and coach. During the First World War, he played for the 1917 Camp Gordon football team.

Auburn University
He was a prominent end for Mike Donahue's Auburn Tigers of Auburn University from 1911 to 1914. He was a member of an All-time Auburn Tigers football team selected in 1935, as well as coach Donahue's all-time Auburn team. He was nominated though not selected for an Associated Press All-Time Southeast 1869-1919 era team.

1913
Robinson was All-Southern in 1913.

1914
He was captain of the 1914 team. One writer claims "Auburn had a lot of great football teams, but there may not have been one greater than the 1913-1914 team."

Coaching career
Robinson assisted coach Bill Alexander and the national champion 1928 Georgia Tech Golden Tornado football team by coaching the ends.

References

1893 births
Year of death missing
American football ends
Auburn Tigers football players
Camp Gordon football players
All-Southern college football players
Georgia Tech Yellow Jackets football coaches
People from Conecuh County, Alabama